Sacred Heart Church is a Roman Catholic church located in Lombard, Illinois. It is part of the Roman Catholic Diocese of Joliet in Illinois.

History 
The church was founded by 54 families in 1912, with the first services held at the Lincoln School house. The first pastor was Father Boecker. In 1958, the church was rebuilt, and was dedicated in 1959 as a permanent church. In January 2002, a new Parish Center was dedicated on the location where the parish's convent had been located since 1925.

The parish hosts an annual Germanfest, which started in 1968 as a small picnic event. Each year, 30 to 40 thousand people attend the festival, which is the longest-running outdoor festival in the western suburbs of Chicago. In 2016 and 2017, the band 7th Heaven performed at the festival.

In 2012, the church held the funeral for inventor Eugene Polley.

See also 
 Sacred Heart School (Lombard, Illinois)

References

External links 
 

1912 establishments in Illinois
Buildings and structures in Lombard, Illinois
Churches in DuPage County, Illinois
Churches in the Roman Catholic Diocese of Joliet in Illinois